Samfundet De Nio (The Nine Society or Society of the Nine) is a Swedish literary society founded on 14 February 1913 in Stockholm by a testamentary donation from writer Lotten von Kraemer. The society has nine members who are elected for life. Its purpose is to promote Swedish literature, peace and women's issues. It mainly presents a number of literary awards. It was started as an alternative to the Swedish Academy and is often compared to its more noted cousin.

Membership
Four seats are always held by women and four by men. Seat number one, the chair, alternates between men and women.

Current members: Anna Williams (chair), Nina Burton, Kerstin Ekman, Jonas Ellerström, Gunnar Harding, Niklas Rådström, Madeleine Gustafsson, Johan Svedjedal

Original members: Viktor Almquist (chair), Selma Lagerlöf, Karl Wåhlin, Ellen Key, Erik Hedén, Kerstin Hård af Segerstad, Göran Björkman, Anna-Maria Roos, John Landquist

Some notable members over the years have been Astrid Lindgren, Elin Wägner, Hjalmar Gullberg, Anders Olsson, Gunnel Vallquist, Karin Boye, Selma Lagerlöf, Sara Lidman, and Knut Ahnlund.

Prizes
 Samfundet De Nios stora pris (Grand Prize), the main prize to Swedish literary writers, has been awarded annually since 1921.
 Originally 10,000 Swedish krona.  it is 250 000 SEK (about €23,000 or US$32,000).
 Lotten von Kraemer's prize (essays)
 De Nios translator's prize
 Stina Aronson's prize
 John Landquist's prize (essayist/idea historian/critic)
 Karl Vennberg's prize (young poets)
 De Nios Winter prize
 De Nios Astrid Lindgren prize
 Anders and Veronica Öhman's prize
 De Nios Lyric poetry prize
 De Nios Special prizes
List of all winners

Winners of the Grand Prize

 1916: E A Karlfeldt, Bertel Gripenberg, Vilhelm Ekelund, Axel Lundegård, Hilma Angered Strandberg, Oscar Stjärne, Verner von Heidenstam
 1917: K.G. Ossiannilsson, Marika Stiernstedt
 1919: K.G. Ossiannilsson
 1920: Hans Larsson
 1921: Olof Högberg
 1922: Tor Hedberg
 1923: Elin Wägner
 1924: Vilhelm Ekelund, Gustaf Ullman
 1925: Fredrik Vetterlund
 1926: Hjalmar Bergman
 1927: Sigfrid Siwertz
 1928: Ludvig Nordström, Pär Lagerkvist
 1929: Per Hallström, Axel Lundegård
 1930: Erik Blomberg, Bertel Gripenberg
 1931: Arvid Mörne, Ernst Didring
 1932: Emilia Fogelklou
 1933: K.G. Ossiannilsson
 1934: Hjalmar Söderberg
 1935: Yrjö Hirn, Jarl Hemmer
 1936: Bertil Malmberg, Eyvind Johnson
 1937: Gustaf Hellström
 1938: Harry Martinson
 1939: Vilhelm Moberg
 1940: Elmer Diktonius, Bertel Gripenberg, Jarl Hemmer, Arvid Mörne, Emil Zilliacus
 1941: Olle Hedberg
 1942: No grand prize
 1943: Sven Lidman
 1944: Moa Martinson
 1945: Frans G Bengtsson
 1946: No grand prize
 1947: Jan Fridegård
 1948: Sigfrid Lindström
 1949: Fritiof Nilsson Piraten, Johannes Edfelt
 1950: Nils Ferlin
 1951: Gunnar Ekelöf, Lucien Maury
 1952: Irja Browallius
 1953: Tage Aurell
 1954: Gabriel Jönsson
 1955: Sivar Arnér
 1956: Bo Bergman, Walter Ljungquist, Stina Aronson
 1957: Karl Vennberg
 1958: Emil Zilliacus
 1959: Anders Österling, Evert Taube
 1960: Lars Ahlin
 1961: Erik Lindegren, Gustaf Hedenvind Eriksson
 1962: Hans Ruin
 1963: Artur Lundkvist, Birgitta Trotzig
 1964: Rabbe Enckell, Peder Sjögren
 1965: Willy Kyrklund
 1966: Lars Gyllensten
 1967: Werner Aspenström, Carl Fries, Per E Rundquist
 1968: Ivan Oljelund, Elsa Grave
 1969: Albert Viksten, Lars Forssell
 1970: Stig Claesson, Majken Johansson
 1971: John Landquist
 1972: Sune Jonsson
 1973: Tito Colliander
 1974: Sonja Åkesson
 1975: Barbro Alving, Eva Moberg
 1976: Sten Hagliden, Olov Hartman
 1977: Sara Lidman
 1978: Ingemar Leckius
 1979: Hans Granlid, Tomas Tranströmer
 1980: Lars Norén
 1981: Rita Tornborg
 1982: No grand prize
 1983: Bengt-Emil Johnson
 1984: Björn von Rosen
 1985: Göran Palm
 1986: Gunnar E Sandgren
 1987: Lennart Hellsing
 1988: Göran Sonnevi
 1989: Katarina Frostenson
 1990: Tobias Berggren, Lars Gustafsson
 1991: Erik Beckman
 1992: Göran Tunström
 1993: Lennart Sjögren
 1994: P O Enquist
 1995: Bo Carpelan
 1996: Lars Andersson
 1997: Per Wästberg
 1998: P C Jersild
 1999: Sigrid Combüchen
 2000: Kjell Espmark
 2001: Tomas Tranströmer
 2002: Bruno K. Öijer
 2003: Ann Jäderlund
 2004: Torgny Lindgren
 2005: Klas Östergren
 2006: Jacques Werup
 2007: Tua Forsström
 2008: Birgitta Lillpers
 2009: Steve Sem-Sandberg
 2010: Ingvar Björkeson
 2011: Kristina Lugn
 2012: Arne Johnsson
 2013: Aris Fioretos
 2014: Kjell Westö
 2015: Sara Stridsberg
 2016: Carola Hansson
 2017: Agneta Pleijel
 2018: Gunnar D. Hansson

Publications
The annual publication Vår Tid (Our Time) was published 1916–1925 and 1930. Svensk Litteraturtidskrift was published from 1938 to 1983. It contained essays, reviews and other texts about Swedish literature. Editors have included Olle Holmberg, Algot Werin and Knut Ahnlund. Samfundet De Nio also published Artes (1975–2005) together with the Swedish Academy, Royal Swedish Academy of Music and the Royal Swedish Academy of Arts. Since 2003 they publish a literary calendar together with Norstedts Förlag.

References

External links
 Official website 

Literary societies
Learned societies of Sweden
Swedish literary awards
Fiction awards
Poetry awards